Kelva may refer to:
 Kalva, Azerbaijan
 Kelwa Beach, Mumbai, India